Lake Altoona, is a man-made lake in Eau Claire County, Wisconsin, United States, bordering the city of Altoona, Wisconsin, and to the east of Eau Claire.

The lake was created by impounding the Eau Claire River with the construction of the Altoona 2WP340 Dam in 1938, with a concrete spillway and sluice gates on the western end of the reservoir. (The "2WP340" refers to the permit number of the Public Service Commission of Wisconsin authorizing the dam.) The dam is owned and operated by Eau Claire County for recreation and water conservation. No hydroelectric power is generated.

Altoona Lake is a 720 acre lake located in Eau Claire County. It has a maximum depth of 25 feet.

References

External links 
 Lake Altoona Rehabilitation & Protection District
 Lake Altoona in context of Lower Chippewa River Basin

Reservoirs in Wisconsin
Dams in Wisconsin
United States local public utility dams
Bodies of water of Eau Claire County, Wisconsin
Dams completed in 1938
Buildings and structures in Eau Claire County, Wisconsin